Tha is a 2010 Tamil-language romantic drama film written and directed by R. K. Surya Prabhakar and produced by Rajesh Uthaman. The film stars Harish Uthaman and Nisha, with Benito Franklin, Vetrivel, Madhankumar, Govindan, Shanmugam,  Chellamuthu, K. K. P. Gopalakrishnan, and Vasanthi playing supporting roles. The film had musical score by Sri Vijay, cinematography by V. S. Devaraj, and editing by Kasi Viswanathan. The film released on 3 December 2010.

Plot

The film begins with the groom Surya preparing to marry Jothi and narrating a flashback.

In a flashback, the young man Surya was a blue-collar worker in a metal workshop. His parents wanted him to marry, but Surya was shy, had low self-esteem, and his only social life was when he met his five friends who were unlike him. Anbu is a photo studio owner and a married womanizer. Velliangiri is a carefree young man working in a cotton factory. Varathan is a loan lender who watches pornography and frequents prostitutes. Govindan is a middle-aged man who is an ardent fan of Kamal Haasan and desperately wants to get married. Shanmugam is a wastrel who tries to woo a village girl. Anbu advised Surya to follow his methods of wooing, but it failed miserably. Surya then watches adult films in a cinema theatre and goes to a brothel as Varathan did, but when a prostitute touches his hand, Surya flees.

Surya's parents then found him a girl: Jothi, a beautiful young woman who studied computer science. However, Jothi did not want to marry Surya: she found him not-good-looking and not educated enough; above all else, she was afraid of him. Surya then tried to change his looks and behavior. The two were later engaged with the blessings of their families. Later, Surya, who became an overprotective fiancé, suspected her college mate Kishore of wooing Jothi and beat him up. Surya then tried to keep Anbu from his fiancé and one day revealed Anbu's seductive activities to his family, and the two got into a fight. Surya even suspected her uncle from Dubai of wooing Jothi. In the meantime, Jothi started to like Surya for being caring and protective. The day before the wedding, a tensed Surya thrashed Jothi's uncle; thus, the wedding was cancelled and her father Chellamuthu wanted Jothi to marry her uncle. Surya and his family returned home. A saddened Surya drank poison. Shortly after, he discovered that his wedding was not cancelled and then fainted. Surya was rushed to the hospital and died there.

Back to the present, Surya's body is buried in a cemetery and it was his spirit who narrated the flashback, while Jothi mourns the loss of her fiancé at his grave.

Cast

Harish Uthaman as Surya
Nisha as Jothi
Benito Franklin as Anbu
Vetrivel as Velliangiri
Madhankumar as Varathan
Govindan as Govindan
Shanmugam as Shanmugam
Chellamuthu as Chellamuthu, Jothi's father
K. K. P. Gopalakrishnan as Subramani, Surya's father
Vasanthi as Surya's mother
Kovai Madhan as Jothi's uncle
J. Durairaj as Kishore
Prabha
Jagadeeshwari
Dhenna
Poorana
Ajantha
Shantos Raama AS as a wedding guest (uncredited)
Goutham Krishnaa A as a wedding guest (uncredited)
Sankaranarayanan S as a wedding guest (uncredited)

Production
Director R. K. Surya Prabhakar, a former associate of Samuthirakani, made his directorial debut with the drama film Tha under the banner of Shreya Films. Harish Uthaman (credited as Sri Hari), a Malayali who was working with an airline crew, was selected to play the lead role. For about five months, Harish Uthaman grew a beard and also did work to darken his skin, as the role demanded that. A Mumbai girl named Nisha was chosen to be the heroine. The film was shot in the drylands of Coimbatore and lush greens of Kerala. The debutante music director Sri Vijay was from Sri Lanka. Kasi Viswanathan took care of the editing and the cinematography was by V. S. Devaraj. Filming Took Place around Coimbatore Near Alandhurai, Theethipalayam, Kovaipudur, Navakkarai in 2009.

Soundtrack

The film score and the soundtrack were composed by Sri Vijay. The soundtrack, released in 2010, features 6 tracks. The audio was launched at Sathyam Cinemas in Chennai. Actor Karthi released the audio and it was received by Samuthirakani. A reviewer said, "The debutante music director has shown promise".

Release
The film was released on 3 December 2010 alongside Chikku Bukku and Ratha Sarithiram.

Critical reception
Behindwoods.com rated the film 2 out of 5 and said, "The hero Sri Hari and heroine Nisha carry off the demands of their character well [..] there is more of a mature relationship of understanding being formed than any romance happening on screen. That treatment puts Thaa on a different track from other love based subjects and director Shurya Prabakar deserves credit for adopting this treatment". Indiaglitz.com wrote, "With linear narrative in flashback, the film has some patience-testing scenes and abruptly-ending sequences. But you can't avoid the feeling of having read a good short story while coming out of the theatre".

Box office
The film took a below average opening at the Chennai box office.

References

2010 films
2010s Tamil-language films
2010 romantic drama films
Indian romantic drama films
Films shot in Coimbatore
Films shot in Palakkad
Films shot in Kerala
2010 directorial debut films